"If I Ever Feel Better" is a song by French band Phoenix, released on 1 June 2000 as the third single from their debut studio album, United. It contains a sample of Japanese jazz musician Toshiyuki Honda's 1979 track "Lament", which was written by Chikara Ueda. The song remains Phoenix's highest charting in both France and internationally, reaching top-10 positions in Belgium, Italy and Spain, as well as number 12 in France. It was certified gold in Italy by FIMI in 2017.

Critical reception
In a review for the band's album It's Never Been Like That, Rob Mitchum of Pitchfork referred to the song and "Everything Is Everything" as "brilliant" with "production as crisp as a Frito and singer Thomas Mars' mercury croon" that "could slot into the playlists of hipsters and receptionists alike". In a review for Erlend Øye's DJ-Kicks album that includes a remix of the track, Nick Sylvester called the original version an "utterly catchy French house gem".

Track listing
 "If I Ever Feel Better" (edit) – 3:42	
 "'If I Ever Feel Better, I'll Go to the Disco' Said the Buffalo Bunch" – 6:09	
 "On Fire" (Nash Kato version) – 2:05

Charts

Certifications

References

1999 songs
2000 singles
French house songs
Phoenix (band) songs
Songs written by Thomas Mars
Songs written by Laurent Brancowitz